The Boeing 747 is a large, long-range wide-body airliner designed and manufactured by Boeing Commercial Airplanes in the United States between 1968 and 2023.

After introducing the 707 in October 1958, Pan Am wanted a jet  times its size, to reduce its seat cost by 30%. In 1965, Joe Sutter left the 737 development program to design the 747, the first twin-aisle airliner. In April 1966, Pan Am ordered 25 Boeing 747-100 aircraft, and in late 1966, Pratt & Whitney agreed to develop the JT9D engine, a high-bypass turbofan. On September 30, 1968, the first 747 was rolled out of the custom-built Everett Plant, the world's largest building by volume. The first flight took place on February 9, 1969, and the 747 was certified in December of that year. It entered service with Pan Am on January 22, 1970. The 747 was the first airplane called a "Jumbo Jet" as the first wide-body airliner.

The 747 is a four-engined jet aircraft, initially powered by Pratt & Whitney JT9D turbofan engines, then General Electric CF6 and Rolls-Royce RB211 engines for the original variants. With a ten-abreast economy seating, it typically accommodates 366 passengers in three travel classes. It has a pronounced 37.5° wing sweep, allowing a  cruise speed, and its heavy weight is supported by four main landing gear legs, each with a four-wheel bogie. The partial double-deck aircraft was designed with a raised cockpit so it could be converted to a freighter airplane by installing a front cargo door, as it was initially thought that it would eventually be superseded by supersonic transports.

It was shortened for the longer-range 747SP in 1976, and the 747-300 followed in 1983 with a stretched upper deck for up to 400 seats in three classes. The heavier 747-400 with improved RB211 and CF6 engines or the new PW4000 engine (the JT9D successor), and a two-crew glass cockpit, was introduced in 1989 and is the most common variant. After several studies, the stretched 747-8 was launched on November 14, 2005, with new General Electric GEnx engines, and was first delivered in October 2011. The 747 is the basis for several government and military variants, such as the VC-25 (Air Force One), E-4 Emergency Airborne Command Post, Shuttle Carrier Aircraft, and some experimental testbeds such as the YAL-1 and SOFIA airborne observatory.

Initial competition came from the smaller trijet widebodies: the Lockheed L-1011 (introduced in 1972), McDonnell Douglas DC-10 (1971) and later MD-11 (1990). Airbus competed with later variants with the heaviest versions of the A340 until surpassing the 747 in size with the A380, delivered between 2007 and 2021. Freighter variants of the 747 remain popular with cargo airlines. The final 747 was delivered to Atlas Air in January 2023 after a 54-year production run, with 1,574 aircraft built.
, 64 Boeing 747s (%) have been lost in accidents and incidents, in which a total of 3,746 people have died.

Development

Background 

In 1963, the United States Air Force started a series of study projects on a very large strategic transport aircraft. Although the C-141 Starlifter was being introduced, officials believed that a much larger and more capable aircraft was needed, especially to carry cargo that would not fit in any existing aircraft.

The desire to keep the number of engines to four required new engine designs with greatly increased power and better fuel economy. In May 1964, airframe proposals arrived from Boeing, Douglas, General Dynamics, Lockheed, and Martin Marietta; engine proposals were submitted by General Electric, Curtiss-Wright, and Pratt & Whitney. Boeing, Douglas, and Lockheed were given additional study contracts for the airframe, along with General Electric and Pratt & Whitney for the engines.

The airframe proposals shared several features. As the CX-HLS needed to be able to be loaded from the front, a door had to be included where the cockpit usually was. All of the companies solved this problem by moving the cockpit above the cargo area; Douglas had a small "pod" just forward and above the wing, Lockheed used a long "spine" running the length of the aircraft with the wing spar passing through it, while Boeing blended the two, with a longer pod that ran from just behind the nose to just behind the wing. In 1965, Lockheed's aircraft design and General Electric's engine design were selected for the new C-5 Galaxy transport, which was the largest military aircraft in the world at the time. Boeing carried the nose door and raised cockpit concepts over to the design of the 747.

Airliner proposal 
The 747 was conceived while air travel was increasing in the 1960s. The era of commercial jet transportation, led by the enormous popularity of the Boeing 707 and Douglas DC-8, had revolutionized long-distance travel. In this growing jet age, Juan Trippe, president of Pan Am, one of Boeing's most important airline customers, asked for a new jet airliner  times size of the 707, with a 30% lower cost per unit of passenger-distance and the capability to offer mass air travel on international routes. Trippe also thought that airport congestion could be addressed by a larger new aircraft.

In 1965, Joe Sutter was transferred from Boeing's 737 development team to manage the design studies for the new airliner, already assigned the model number 747. Sutter began a design study with Pan Am and other airlines to better understand their requirements. At the time, many thought that long-range subsonic airliners would eventually be superseded by supersonic transport aircraft. Boeing responded by designing the 747 so it could be adapted easily to carry freight and remain in production even if sales of the passenger version declined.

In April 1966, Pan Am ordered 25 Boeing 747-100 aircraft for US$525 million (equivalent to $ billion in  dollars). During the ceremonial 747 contract-signing banquet in Seattle on Boeing's 50th Anniversary, Juan Trippe predicted that the 747 would be "…a great weapon for peace, competing with intercontinental missiles for mankind's destiny". As launch customer, and because of its early involvement before placing a formal order, Pan Am was able to influence the design and development of the 747 to an extent unmatched by a single airline before or since.

Design effort 
Ultimately, the high-winged CX-HLS Boeing design was not used for the 747, although technologies developed for their bid had an influence. The original design included a full-length double-deck fuselage with eight-across seating and two aisles on the lower deck and seven-across seating and two aisles on the upper deck. However, concern over evacuation routes and limited cargo-carrying capability caused this idea to be scrapped in early 1966 in favor of a wider single deck design. The cockpit was, therefore, placed on a shortened upper deck so that a freight-loading door could be included in the nose cone; this design feature produced the 747's distinctive "hump". In early models, what to do with the small space in the pod behind the cockpit was not clear, and this was initially specified as a "lounge" area with no permanent seating. (A different configuration that had been considered to keep the flight deck out of the way for freight loading had the pilots below the passengers, and was dubbed the "anteater".)

One of the principal technologies that enabled an aircraft as large as the 747 to be drawn up was the high-bypass turbofan engine. This engine technology was thought to be capable of delivering double the power of the earlier turbojets while consuming one-third less fuel. General Electric had pioneered the concept but was committed to developing the engine for the C-5 Galaxy and did not enter the commercial market until later. Pratt & Whitney was also working on the same principle and, by late 1966, Boeing, Pan Am and Pratt & Whitney agreed to develop a new engine, designated the JT9D to power the 747.

The project was designed with a new methodology called fault tree analysis, which allowed the effects of a failure of a single part to be studied to determine its impact on other systems. To address concerns about safety and flyability, the 747's design included structural redundancy, redundant hydraulic systems, quadruple main landing gear and dual control surfaces. Additionally, some of the most advanced high-lift devices used in the industry were included in the new design, to allow it to operate from existing airports. These included Krueger flaps running almost the entire length of the wing's leading edge, as well as complex three-part slotted flaps along the trailing edge of the wing. The wing's complex three-part flaps increase wing area by 21% and lift by 90% when fully deployed compared to their non-deployed configuration.

Boeing agreed to deliver the first 747 to Pan Am by the end of 1969. The delivery date left 28 months to design the aircraft, which was two-thirds of the normal time. The schedule was so fast-paced that the people who worked on it were given the nickname "The Incredibles". Developing the aircraft was such a technical and financial challenge that management was said to have "bet the company" when it started the project.

Production plant 

As Boeing did not have a plant large enough to assemble the giant airliner, they chose to build a new plant. It bought the  site in June 1966.

Developing the 747 had been a major challenge, and building its assembly plant was also a huge undertaking. Boeing president William M. Allen asked Malcolm T. Stamper, then head of the company's turbine division, to oversee construction of the Everett factory and to start production of the 747. Time was so short that the 747's full-scale mock-up was built before the factory roof above it was finished. The plant is the largest building by volume ever built, and has been substantially expanded several times to permit construction of other models of Boeing wide-body commercial jets.

Development and testing 

Before the first 747 was fully assembled, testing began on many components and systems. One important test involved the evacuation of 560 volunteers from a cabin mock-up via the aircraft's emergency chutes. The first full-scale evacuation took two and a half minutes instead of the maximum of 90 seconds mandated by the Federal Aviation Administration (FAA), and several volunteers were injured. Subsequent test evacuations achieved the 90-second goal but caused more injuries. Most problematic was evacuation from the aircraft's upper deck; instead of using a conventional slide, volunteer passengers escaped by using a harness attached to a reel. Tests also involved taxiing such a large aircraft. Boeing built an unusual training device known as "Waddell's Wagon" (named for a 747 test pilot, Jack Waddell) that consisted of a mock-up cockpit mounted on the roof of a truck. While the first 747s were still being built, the device allowed pilots to practice taxi maneuvers from a high upper-deck position.

In 1968, the program cost was US$1 billion (equivalent to $ billion in  dollars). On September 30, 1968, the first 747 was rolled out of the Everett assembly building before the world's press and representatives of the 26 airlines that had ordered the airliner. Over the following months, preparations were made for the first flight, which took place on February 9, 1969, with test pilots Jack Waddell and Brien Wygle at the controls and Jess Wallick at the flight engineer's station. Despite a minor problem with one of the flaps, the flight confirmed that the 747 handled extremely well. The 747 was found to be largely immune to "Dutch roll", a phenomenon that had been a major hazard to the early swept-wing jets.

During later stages of the flight test program, flutter testing showed that the wings suffered oscillation under certain conditions. This difficulty was partly solved by reducing the stiffness of some wing components. However, a particularly severe high-speed flutter problem was solved only by inserting depleted uranium counterweights as ballast in the outboard engine nacelles of the early 747s.

The flight test program was hampered by problems with the 747's JT9D engines. Difficulties included engine stalls caused by rapid throttle movements and distortion of the turbine casings after a short period of service. The problems delayed 747 deliveries for several months; up to 20 aircraft at the Everett plant were stranded while awaiting engine installation. The program was further delayed when one of the five test aircraft suffered serious damage during a landing attempt at Renton Municipal Airport, the site of Boeing's Renton factory. The incident happened on December 13, 1969, when a test aircraft was flown to Renton to have test equipment removed and a cabin installed. Pilot Ralph C. Cokely undershot the airport's short runway and the 747's right, outer landing gear was torn off and two engine nacelles were damaged. However, these difficulties did not prevent Boeing from taking a test aircraft to the 28th Paris Air Show in mid-1969, where it was displayed to the public for the first time. The 747 received its FAA airworthiness certificate in December 1969, clearing it for introduction into service.

The huge cost of developing the 747 and building the Everett factory meant that Boeing had to borrow heavily from a banking syndicate. During the final months before delivery of the first aircraft, the company had to repeatedly request additional funding to complete the project. Had this been refused, Boeing's survival would have been threatened. The firm's debt exceeded $2 billion, with the $1.2 billion owed to the banks setting a record for all companies. Allen later said, "It was really too large a project for us." Ultimately, the gamble succeeded, and Boeing held a monopoly in very large passenger aircraft production for many years.

Entry into service 

On January 15, 1970, First Lady of the United States Pat Nixon christened Pan Am's first 747 at Dulles International Airport (later Washington Dulles International Airport) in the presence of Pan Am chairman Najeeb Halaby. Instead of champagne, red, white, and blue water was sprayed on the aircraft. The 747 entered service on January 22, 1970, on Pan Am's New York–London route; the flight had been planned for the evening of January 21, but engine overheating made the original aircraft unusable. Finding a substitute delayed the flight by more than six hours to the following day when Clipper Victor was used.

The 747 enjoyed a fairly smooth introduction into service, overcoming concerns that some airports would not be able to accommodate an aircraft that large. Although technical problems occurred, they were relatively minor and quickly solved. After the aircraft's introduction with Pan Am, other airlines that had bought the 747 to stay competitive began to put their own 747s into service. Boeing estimated that half of the early 747 sales were to airlines desiring the aircraft's long range rather than its payload capacity. While the 747 had the lowest potential operating cost per seat, this could only be achieved when the aircraft was fully loaded; costs per seat increased rapidly as occupancy declined. A moderately loaded 747, one with only 70 percent of its seats occupied, used more than 95 percent of the fuel needed by a fully occupied 747. Nonetheless, many flag-carriers purchased the 747 due to its prestige "even if it made no sense economically" to operate. During the 1970s and 1980s, over 30 regularly scheduled 747s could often be seen at John F. Kennedy International Airport.

The recession of 1969–1970, despite having been characterized as relatively mild, greatly affected Boeing. For the year and a half after September 1970, it only sold two 747s in the world, both to Irish flag carrier Aer Lingus.
No 747s were sold to any American carrier for almost three years. When economic problems in the US and other countries after the 1973 oil crisis led to reduced passenger traffic, several airlines found they did not have enough passengers to fly the 747 economically, and they replaced them with the smaller and recently introduced McDonnell Douglas DC-10 and Lockheed L-1011 TriStar trijet wide bodies (and later the 767 and A300/A310 twinjets). Having tried replacing coach seats on its 747s with piano bars in an attempt to attract more customers, American Airlines eventually relegated its 747s to cargo service and in 1983 exchanged them with Pan Am for smaller aircraft; Delta Air Lines also removed its 747s from service after several years. Later, Delta acquired 747s again in 2008 as part of its merger with Northwest Airlines, although it retired the Boeing 747-400 fleet in December 2017.

International flights bypassing traditional hub airports and landing at smaller cities became more common throughout the 1980s, thus eroding the 747's original market. Many international carriers continued to use the 747 on Pacific routes. In Japan, 747s on domestic routes were configured to carry nearly the maximum passenger capacity.

Improved 747 versions 

Increased maximum takeoff weight allows aircraft to carry more fuel and have longer range. The  model followed in 1971, featuring more powerful engines and a higher MTOW. The shortened 747SP (special performance) with a longer range was also developed, and entered service in 1976.

The 300 series resulted from Boeing studies to increase the seating capacity of the 747, during which modifications such as fuselage plugs and extending the upper deck over the entire length of the fuselage were rejected. The first , completed in 1983, included a stretched upper deck, increased cruise speed, and increased seating capacity. The -300 variant was previously designated 747SUD for stretched upper deck, then 747-200 SUD, followed by 747EUD, before the 747-300 designation was used. Passenger, short range and combination freighter-passenger versions of the 300 series were produced.

In 1985, development of the longer range 747-400 began. The variant had a new glass cockpit, which allowed for a cockpit crew of two instead of three, new engines, lighter construction materials, and a redesigned interior. Development costs soared, and production delays occurred as new technologies were incorporated at the request of airlines. The -400 entered service in 1989.

In 1991, a record-breaking 1,087 passengers were flown in a 747 during a covert operation to airlift Ethiopian Jews to Israel. Generally, the 747-400 held between 416 and 524 passengers. The 747 remained the heaviest commercial aircraft in regular service until the debut of the Antonov An-124 Ruslan in 1982; variants of the 747-400 surpassed the An-124's weight in 2000. The Antonov An-225 Mriya cargo transport, which debuted in 1988, remains the world's largest aircraft by several measures (including the most accepted measures of maximum takeoff weight and length); one aircraft has been completed and was in service until 2022. The Scaled Composites Stratolaunch is currently the largest aircraft by wingspan.

Further developments 

Boeing announced the larger 747-500X and  preliminary designs in 1996. The new variants would have cost more than US$5 billion to develop, and interest was not sufficient to launch the program. In 2000, Boeing offered the more modest 747X and 747X stretch derivatives as alternatives to the Airbus A3XX. However, the 747X family was unable to attract enough interest to enter production. A year later, Boeing switched from the 747X studies to pursue the Sonic Cruiser, and after the Sonic Cruiser program was put on hold, the 787 Dreamliner.

After several variants were proposed but later abandoned, some industry observers became skeptical of new aircraft proposals from Boeing. However, in early 2004, Boeing announced tentative plans for the 747 Advanced that were eventually adopted. Similar in nature to the 747-X, the stretched 747 Advanced used technology from the 787 to modernize the design and its systems. The 747 remained the largest passenger airliner in service until the Airbus A380 began airline service in 2007.

On November 14, 2005, Boeing announced it was launching the 747 Advanced as the Boeing 747-8. The last 747-400s were completed in 2009. , most orders of the 747-8 were for the freighter variant. On February 8, 2010, the 747-8 Freighter made its maiden flight. The first delivery of the 747-8 went to Cargolux in 2011.  The first 747-8 Intercontinental passenger variant was delivered to Lufthansa on May 5, 2012. The 1,500th Boeing 747 was delivered in June 2014 to Lufthansa.

In January 2016, Boeing stated it was reducing 747-8 production to six a year beginning in September 2016, incurring a $569 million post-tax charge against its fourth-quarter 2015 profits. At the end of 2015, the company had 20 orders outstanding. On January 29, 2016, Boeing announced that it had begun the preliminary work on the modifications to a commercial 747-8 for the next Air Force One presidential aircraft, then expected to be operational by 2020.

On July 12, 2016, Boeing announced that it had finalized an order from Volga-Dnepr Group for 20 747-8 freighters, valued at $7.58 billion at list prices. Four aircraft were delivered beginning in 2012. Volga-Dnepr Group is the parent of three major Russian air-freight carriers – Volga-Dnepr Airlines, AirBridgeCargo Airlines and Atran Airlines. The new 747-8 freighters would replace AirBridgeCargo's current 747-400 aircraft and expand the airline's fleet and will be acquired through a mix of direct purchases and leasing over the next six years, Boeing said.

End of production 
On July 27, 2016, in its quarterly report to the Securities and Exchange Commission, Boeing discussed the potential termination of 747 production due to insufficient demand and market for the aircraft. With a firm order backlog of 21 aircraft and a production rate of six per year, program accounting had been reduced to 1,555 aircraft. In October 2016, UPS Airlines ordered 14 -8Fs to add capacity, along with 14 options, which it took in February 2018 to increase the total to 28 -8Fs on order. The backlog then stood at 25 aircraft, though several of these were orders from airlines that no longer intended to take delivery.

On July 2, 2020, it was reported that Boeing planned to end 747 production in 2022 upon delivery of the remaining jets on order to UPS and the Volga-Dnepr Group due to low demand. On July 29, 2020, Boeing confirmed that the final 747 would be delivered in 2022 as a result of "current market dynamics and outlook" stemming from the COVID-19 pandemic, according to CEO David Calhoun. The last aircraft, a 747-8F for Atlas Air, rolled off the production line on December 6, 2022, and was delivered on January 31, 2023. Boeing hosted an event at the Everett factory for thousands of workers as well as industry executives to commemorate the delivery.

Design 

The Boeing 747 is a large, wide-body (two-aisle) airliner with four wing-mounted engines. Its wings have a high sweep angle of 37.5° for a fast, efficient cruise speed of Mach 0.84 to 0.88, depending on the variant. The sweep also reduces the wingspan, allowing the 747 to use existing hangars. Its seating capacity is over 366 with a 3–4–3 seat arrangement (a cross section of three seats, an aisle, four seats, another aisle, and three seats) in economy class and a 2–3–2 layout in first class on the main deck. The upper deck has a 3–3 seat arrangement in economy class and a 2–2 layout in first class.

Raised above the main deck, the cockpit creates a hump. This raised cockpit allows front loading of cargo on freight variants. The upper deck behind the cockpit provides space for a lounge and/or extra seating. The "stretched upper deck" became available as an alternative on the  variant and later as standard beginning on the 747-300. The upper deck was stretched more on the 747-8. The 747 cockpit roof section also has an escape hatch from which crew can exit during the events of an emergency if they cannot do so through the cabin.

The 747 has redundant structures along with four redundant hydraulic systems and four main landing gears each with four wheels; these provide a good spread of support on the ground and safety in case of tire blow-outs. The main gear are redundant so that landing can be performed on two opposing landing gears if the others are not functioning properly. The 747 also has split control surfaces and was designed with sophisticated triple-slotted flaps that minimize landing speeds and allow the 747 to use standard-length runways.

For transportation of spare engines, the 747 can accommodate a non-functioning fifth-pod engine under the aircraft's port wing between the inner functioning engine and the fuselage. The fifth engine mount point is also used by Virgin Orbit's LauncherOne program to carry an orbital-class rocket to cruise altitude where it is deployed.

Variants 
The 747-100 with a range of 4,620 nautical miles (8,556 km), was the original variant launched in 1966. The 747-200 soon followed, with its launch in 1968. Ultimately, the 747-8 was announced in 2005. Several versions of each variant have been produced, and many of the early variants were in production simultaneously. The International Civil Aviation Organization (ICAO) classifies variants using a shortened code formed by combining the model number and the variant designator (e.g. "B741" for all -100 models).

747-100 

The first 747-100s were built with six upper deck windows (three per side) to accommodate upstairs lounge areas. Later, as airlines began to use the upper deck for premium passenger seating instead of lounge space, Boeing offered an upper deck with ten windows on either side as an option. Some early -100s were retrofitted with the new configuration. The -100 was equipped with Pratt & Whitney JT9D-3A engines. No freighter version of this model was developed, but many 747-100s were converted into freighters as 747-100(SF). The first 747-100(SF) was delivered to Flying Tiger Line in 1974. A total of 168 747-100s were built; 167 were delivered to customers, while Boeing kept the prototype, City of Everett. In 1972, its unit cost was US$24M (M today).

747SR 
With increased economy class seating, up to 498 passengers could be carried in early versions and up to 550 in later models. The 747SR had an economic design life objective of 52,000 flights during 20 years of operation, compared to 24,600 flights in 20 years for the standard 747. The initial 747SR model, the -100SR, had a strengthened body structure and landing gear to accommodate the added stress accumulated from a greater number of takeoffs and landings. Extra structural support was built into the wings, fuselage, and the landing gear along with a 20% reduction in fuel capacity.

The initial order for the -100SR – four aircraft for Japan Air Lines (JAL, later Japan Airlines) – was announced on October 30, 1972; rollout occurred on August 3, 1973, and the first flight took place on August 31, 1973. The type was certified by the FAA on September 26, 1973, with the first delivery on the same day. The -100SR entered service with JAL, the type's sole customer, on October 7, 1973, and typically operated flights within Japan.

Following the -100SR, Boeing produced the -100BSR, a 747SR variant with increased takeoff weight capability. Debuting in 1978, the -100BSR also incorporated structural modifications for a high cycle-to-flying hour ratio; a related standard -100B model debuted in 1979. The -100BSR first flew on November 3, 1978, with first delivery to All Nippon Airways (ANA) on December 21, 1978. A total of 20 -100BSRs were produced for ANA and JAL. The -100BSR had a  MTOW and was powered by the same JT9D-7A or General Electric CF6-45 engines used on the -100SR. ANA operated this variant on domestic Japanese routes with 455 or 456 seats until retiring its last aircraft in March 2006.

In 1986, two -100BSR SUD models, featuring the stretched upper deck (SUD) of the -300, were produced for JAL. The type's maiden flight occurred on February 26, 1986, with FAA certification and first delivery on March 24, 1986. JAL operated the -100BSR SUD with 563 seats on domestic routes until their retirement in the third quarter of 2006. While only two -100BSR SUDs were produced, in theory, standard -100Bs can be modified to the SUD certification. Overall, 29 Boeing 747SRs were built.

747-100B 

The 747-100B model was developed from the -100SR, using its stronger airframe and landing gear design. The first -100B order, one aircraft for Iran Air, was announced on June 1, 1978. This version first flew on June 20, 1979, received FAA certification on August 1, 1979, and was delivered the next day. Nine -100Bs were built, one for Iran Air and eight for Saudi Arabian Airlines. Unlike the original -100, the -100B was offered with Pratt & Whitney JT9D-7A, CF6-50, or Rolls-Royce RB211-524 engines. However, only RB211-524 (Saudia) and JT9D-7A (Iran Air) engines were ordered. The last 747-100B, EP-IAM was retired by Iran Air in 2014, the last commercial operator of the 747-100 and -100B.

747SP 

The development of the 747SP stemmed from a joint request between Pan American World Airways and Iran Air, who were looking for a high-capacity airliner with enough range to cover Pan Am's New York–Middle Eastern routes and Iran Air's planned Tehran–New York route. The Tehran–New York route, when launched, was the longest non-stop commercial flight in the world. Fuselage sections were eliminated fore and aft of the wing, and the center section of the fuselage was redesigned to fit mating fuselage sections. The SP's flaps used a simplified single-slotted configuration. The 747SP, compared to earlier variants, had a tapering of the aft upper fuselage into the empennage, a double-hinged rudder, and longer vertical and horizontal stabilizers. Power was provided by Pratt & Whitney JT9D-7(A/F/J/FW) or Rolls-Royce RB211-524 engines.

The 747SP was granted a type certificate on February 4, 1976, and entered service with launch customers Pan Am and Iran Air that same year. The aircraft was chosen by airlines wishing to serve major airports with short runways. A total of 45 747SPs were built, with the 44th 747SP delivered on August 30, 1982. In 1987, Boeing re-opened the 747SP production line after five years to build one last 747SP for an order by the United Arab Emirates government. In addition to airline use, one 747SP was modified for the NASA/German Aerospace Center SOFIA experiment. Iran Air is the last civil operator of the type; its final 747-SP (EP-IAC) was to be retired in June 2016.

747-200 

While the 747-100 powered by Pratt & Whitney JT9D-3A engines offered enough payload and range for medium-haul operations, it was marginal for long-haul route sectors. The demand for longer range aircraft with increased payload quickly led to the improved -200, which featured more powerful engines, increased MTOW, and greater range than the -100. A few early -200s retained the three-window configuration of the -100 on the upper deck, but most were built with a ten-window configuration on each side. The 747-200 was produced in passenger (-200B), freighter (-200F), convertible (-200C), and combi (-200M) versions.

The 747-200B was the basic passenger version, with increased fuel capacity and more powerful engines; it entered service in February 1971. In its first three years of production, the -200 was equipped with Pratt & Whitney JT9D-7 engines (initially the only engine available). Most -200Bs had an internally stretched upper deck, allowing for up to 16 passenger seats. It entered service in 1972 with Lufthansa. The convertible version, the 747-200C, could be converted between a passenger and a freighter or used in mixed configurations, and featured removable seats and a nose cargo door. The -200C could also be outfitted with an optional side cargo door on the main deck.

The combi aircraft model, the 747-200M (originally designated 747-200BC), could carry freight in the rear section of the main deck via a side cargo door. A removable partition on the main deck separated the cargo area at the rear from the passengers at the front. The -200M could carry up to 238 passengers in a three-class configuration with cargo carried on the main deck. The model was also known as the 747-200 Combi. As on the -100, a stretched upper deck (SUD) modification was later offered. A total of 10 747-200s operated by KLM were converted. Union de Transports Aériens (UTA) also had two aircraft converted.

After launching the -200 with Pratt & Whitney JT9D-7 engines, on August 1, 1972, Boeing announced that it had reached an agreement with General Electric to certify the 747 with CF6-50 series engines to increase the aircraft's market potential. Rolls-Royce followed 747 engine production with a launch order from British Airways for four aircraft. The option of RB211-524B engines was announced on June 17, 1975. The -200 was the first 747 to provide a choice of powerplant from the three major engine manufacturers.
In 1976, its unit cost was US$39M (M today).

A total of 393 of the 747-200 versions had been built when production ended in 1991. Of these, 225 were -200B, 73 were -200F, 13 were -200C, 78 were -200M, and 4 were military. Iran Air retired the last passenger  in May 2016, 36 years after it was delivered.  , five 747-200s remain in service as freighters.

747-300 

The 747-300 features a  upper deck than the -200. The stretched upper deck (SUD) has two emergency exit doors and is the most visible difference between the -300 and previous models. After being made standard on the 747-300, the SUD was offered as a retrofit, and as an option to earlier variants still in-production. An example for a retrofit were two UTA -200 Combis being converted in 1986, and an example for the option were two brand-new JAL -100 aircraft (designated -100BSR SUD), the first of which was delivered on March 24, 1986.

The 747-300 introduced a new straight stairway to the upper deck, instead of a spiral staircase on earlier variants, which creates room above and below for more seats. Minor aerodynamic changes allowed the -300's cruise speed to reach Mach 0.85 compared with Mach 0.84 on the -200 and -100 models, while retaining the same takeoff weight. The -300 could be equipped with the same Pratt & Whitney and Rolls-Royce powerplants as on the -200, as well as updated General Electric CF6-80C2B1 engines.

The variant revived the 747-300 designation, which had been previously used on a design study that did not reach production. The 747-300 first flew on October 5, 1982, and the type's first delivery went to Swissair on March 23, 1983. In 1982, its unit cost was US$83M (M today). Besides the passenger model, two other versions (-300M, -300SR) were produced. The 747-300M features cargo capacity on the rear portion of the main deck, similar to the -200M, but with the stretched upper deck it can carry more passengers. The 747-300SR, a short range, high-capacity domestic model, was produced for Japanese markets with a maximum seating for 584. No production freighter version of the 747-300 was built, but Boeing began modifications of used passenger -300 models into freighters in 2000.

A total of 81  series aircraft were delivered, 56 for passenger use, 21 -300M and 4 -300SR versions. In 1985, just two years after the -300 entered service, the type was superseded by the announcement of the more advanced 747-400. The last 747-300 was delivered in September 1990 to Sabena. While some -300 customers continued operating the type, several large carriers replaced their 747-300s with 747-400s. On December 29, 2008, Qantas flew its last scheduled 747-300 service, operating from Melbourne to Los Angeles via Auckland. In July 2015, Pakistan International Airlines retired their final 747-300 after 30 years of service. , only two 747-300s remain in commercial service, with Mahan Air (1) and TransAVIAexport Airlines (1).

747-400 

The 747-400 is an improved model with increased range. The 747-400 introduced a new glass cockpit designed for a flight crew of two instead of three, with a reduction in the number of dials, gauges and knobs from 971 to 365 through the use of electronics. The type also features tail fuel tanks, revised engines, and a new interior. The longer range has been used by some airlines to bypass traditional fuel stops, such as Anchorage. A 747-400 loaded with 126,000 lb of fuel flying 3,500 statute miles consumes an average of five gallons per mile. Powerplants include the Pratt & Whitney PW4062, General Electric CF6-80C2, and Rolls-Royce RB211-524. As a result of the Boeing 767 development overlapping with the 747-400's development, both aircraft can use the same three powerplants and are even interchangeable between the two aircraft models.

The  was offered in passenger (-400), freighter (-400F), combi (-400M), domestic (-400D), extended range passenger (-400ER), and extended range freighter (-400ERF) versions. The 747-400D was built for short-range operations with maximum seating for 624. Winglets were not included, but they can be retrofitted.

The passenger version first entered service in February 1989 with launch customer Northwest Airlines on the Minneapolis to Phoenix route. The combi version entered service in September 1989 with KLM, while the freighter version entered service in November 1993 with Cargolux. The 747-400ERF entered service with Air France in October 2002, while the 747-400ER entered service with Qantas, its sole customer, in November 2002. In January 2004, Boeing and Cathay Pacific launched the Boeing 747-400 Special Freighter program, later referred to as the Boeing Converted Freighter (BCF), to modify passenger 747-400s for cargo use. The first 747-400BCF was redelivered in December 2005.

In March 2007, Boeing announced that it had no plans to produce further passenger versions of the -400. However, orders for 36 -400F and -400ERF freighters were already in place at the time of the announcement. The last passenger version of the 747-400 was delivered in April 2005 to China Airlines. Some of the last built 747-400s were delivered with Dreamliner livery along with the modern Signature interior from the Boeing 777. A total of 694 of the  series aircraft were delivered. At various times, the largest 747-400 operator has included Singapore Airlines, Japan Airlines, and British Airways. , 331 Boeing 747-400s were in service; there were only 10 Boeing 747-400s in passenger service as of September 2021.

747 LCF Dreamlifter 

The 747-400 Dreamlifter (originally called the 747 Large Cargo Freighter or LCF) is a Boeing-designed modification of existing 747-400s into a larger outsize cargo freighter configuration to ferry 787 Dreamliner sub-assemblies. Evergreen Aviation Technologies Corporation of Taiwan was contracted to complete modifications of 747-400s into Dreamlifters in Taoyuan. The aircraft flew for the first time on September 9, 2006, in a test flight. Modification of four aircraft was completed by February 2010. The Dreamlifters have been placed into service transporting sub-assemblies for the 787 program to the Boeing plant in Everett, Washington, for final assembly. The aircraft is certified to carry only essential crew and not passengers.

747-8 

Referred to as the 747 Advanced prior to its launch, the 747-8 uses similar General Electric GEnx engines and cockpit technology to the 787. The variant is designed to be quieter, more economical, and more environmentally friendly.

The 747-8 Freighter, or 747-8F, has 16% more payload capacity than its predecessor, allowing it to carry seven more standard air cargo containers, with a maximum payload capacity 154 tons (140 tonnes) of cargo. As on previous 747 freighters, the 747-8F features a flip up nose-door, a side-door on the main deck, and a side-door on the lower deck ("belly") to aid loading and unloading. The 747-8F made its maiden flight on February 8, 2010. The variant received its amended type certificate jointly from the FAA and the European Aviation Safety Agency (EASA) on August 19, 2011. The -8F was first delivered to Cargolux on October 12, 2011.

As a derivative of the already common , the 747-8I has the economic benefit of similar training and interchangeable parts. The type's first test flight occurred on March 20, 2011. The 747-8 has surpassed the Airbus A340-600 as the world's longest airliner, a record it would hold until the 777X, which first flew in 2020. The first -8I was delivered in May 2012 to Lufthansa. The 747-8 has received 155 total orders, including 106 for the -8F and 47 for the -8I . The final 747-8F was delivered to Atlas Air on January 31, 2023.

Government, military, and other variants 

 VC-25 – This aircraft is the U.S. Air Force very important person (VIP) version of the 747-200B. The U.S. Air Force operates two of them in VIP configuration as the VC-25A. Tail numbers 28000 and 29000 are popularly known as Air Force One, which is technically the air-traffic call sign for any United States Air Force aircraft carrying the U.S. President. Partially completed aircraft from Everett, Washington, were flown to Wichita, Kansas, for final outfitting by Boeing Military Airplane Company.
 E-4B – This is an airborne command post designed for use in nuclear war. Three E-4As, based on the 747-200B, with a fourth aircraft, with more powerful engines and upgraded systems delivered in 1979 as a E-4B, with the three E-4As upgraded to this standard. Formerly known as the National Emergency Airborne Command Post (referred to colloquially as "Kneecap"), this type is now referred to as the National Airborne Operations Center (NAOC).
 YAL-1 – This was the experimental Airborne Laser, a planned component of the U.S. National Missile Defense.
 Shuttle Carrier Aircraft (SCA) – Two 747s were modified to carry the Space Shuttle orbiter. The first was a 747-100 (N905NA), and the other was a 747-100SR (N911NA). The first SCA carried the prototype Enterprise during the Approach and Landing Tests in the late 1970s. The two SCA later carried all five operational Space Shuttle orbiters.
 C-33 – This aircraft was a proposed U.S. military version of the 747-400F intended to augment the C-17 fleet. The plan was canceled in favor of additional C-17s.
 KC-25/33 – A proposed 747-200F was also adapted as an aerial refueling tanker and was bid against the DC-10-30 during the 1970s Advanced Cargo Transport Aircraft (ACTA) program that produced the KC-10 Extender. Before the 1979 Iranian Revolution, Iran bought four 747-100 aircraft with air-refueling boom conversions to support its fleet of F-4 Phantoms. There is a report of the Iranians using a 747 Tanker in H-3 airstrike during Iran–Iraq War. It is unknown whether these aircraft remain usable as tankers. Since then there have been proposals to use a 747-400 for that role.
 747F Airlifter – Proposed US military transport version of the 747-200F intended as an alternative to further purchases of the C-5 Galaxy. This 747 would have had a special nose jack to lower the sill height for the nose door. System tested in 1980 on a Flying Tiger Line 747-200F.
 747 CMCA – This "Cruise Missile Carrier Aircraft" variant was considered by the U.S. Air Force during the development of the B-1 Lancer strategic bomber. It would have been equipped with 50 to 100 AGM-86 ALCM cruise missiles on rotary launchers. This plan was abandoned in favor of more conventional strategic bombers.
 747 AAC – A Boeing study under contract from the USAF for an "airborne aircraft carrier" for up to 10 Boeing Model 985-121 "microfighters" with the ability to launch, retrieve, re-arm, and refuel. Boeing believed that the scheme would be able to deliver a flexible and fast carrier platform with global reach, particularly where other bases were not available. Modified versions of the 747-200 and Lockheed C-5A were considered as the base aircraft. The concept, which included a complementary 747 AWACS version with two reconnaissance "microfighters", was considered technically feasible in 1973.
 Evergreen 747 Supertanker – A Boeing 747-200 modified as an aerial application platform for fire fighting using  of firefighting chemicals.
 Stratospheric Observatory for Infrared Astronomy (SOFIA) – A former Pan Am Boeing 747SP modified to carry a large infrared-sensitive telescope, in a joint venture of NASA and DLR. High altitudes are needed for infrared astronomy, to rise above infrared-absorbing water vapor in the atmosphere.
 A number of other governments also use the 747 as a VIP transport, including Bahrain, Brunei, India, Iran, Japan, Kuwait, Oman, Pakistan, Qatar, Saudi Arabia and United Arab Emirates. Several Boeing 747-8s have been ordered by Boeing Business Jet for conversion to VIP transports for several unidentified customers.

Undeveloped variants 
Boeing has studied a number of 747 variants that have not gone beyond the concept stage.

747 trijet 
During the late 1960s and early 1970s, Boeing studied the development of a shorter 747 with three engines, to compete with the smaller Lockheed L-1011 TriStar and McDonnell Douglas DC-10. The center engine would have been fitted in the tail with an S-duct intake similar to the L-1011's. Overall, the 747 trijet would have had more payload, range, and passenger capacity than both of them. However, engineering studies showed that a major redesign of the 747 wing would be necessary. Maintaining the same 747 handling characteristics would be important to minimize pilot retraining. Boeing decided instead to pursue a shortened four-engine 747, resulting in the 747SP.

747-500 
The aircraft would be stretched (including the upper deck section) to a capacity of 500 seats, have a new wing to reduce drag, cruise at a faster speed to reduce flight times, and have a range of at least , which would allow airlines to fly nonstop between London, England and Sydney, Australia.

747 ASB 
Boeing announced the 747 ASB (Advanced Short Body) in 1986 as a response to the Airbus A340 and the McDonnell Douglas MD-11. This aircraft design would have combined the advanced technology used on the 747-400 with the foreshortened 747SP fuselage. However, airlines were not interested in the project and it was canceled in 1988 in favor of the 777.

747-500X, -600X, and -700X 

Boeing announced the 747-500X and -600X at the 1996 Farnborough Airshow. The proposed models would have combined the 747's fuselage with a new wing spanning  derived from the 777. Other changes included adding more powerful engines and increasing the number of tires from two to four on the nose landing gear and from 16 to 20 on the main landing gear.

The cost of the changes from previous 747 models, in particular the new wing for the 747-500X and -600X, was estimated to be more than US$5 billion. Boeing was not able to attract enough interest to launch the aircraft.

747X and 747X Stretch 
Power would have been supplied by either the Engine Alliance GP7172 or the Rolls-Royce Trent 600, which were also proposed for the 767-400ERX. A new flight deck based on the 777's would be used. Both would feature an interior based on the 777. Freighter versions of the 747X and 747X Stretch were also studied.

Like its predecessor, the 747X family was unable to garner enough interest to justify production, and it was shelved along with the 767-400ERX in March 2001, when Boeing announced the Sonic Cruiser concept. Though the 747X design was less costly than the 747-500X and -600X, it was criticized for not offering a sufficient advance from the existing . The 747X did not make it beyond the drawing board, but the 747-400X being developed concurrently moved into production to become the 747-400ER.

747-400XQLR 
After the end of the 747X program, Boeing continued to study improvements that could be made to the 747. Improvements studied included raked wingtips similar to those used on the 767-400ER and a sawtooth engine nacelle for noise reduction. Although the 747-400XQLR did not move to production, many of its features were used for the 747 Advanced, which was launched as the 747-8 in 2005.

Operators 

In 1979, Qantas became the first airline in the world to operate an all Boeing 747 fleet, with seventeen aircraft.

, there were 462 Boeing 747s in airline service, with Atlas Air and British Airways being the largest operators with 33 747-400s each.

The last US passenger Boeing 747 was retired from Delta Air Lines in December 2017, after it flew for every American major carrier since its 1970 introduction. Delta flew three of its last four aircraft on a farewell tour, from Seattle to Atlanta on December 19 then to Los Angeles and Minneapolis/St Paul on December 20.

As the IATA forecast an increase in air freight from 4% to 5% in 2018 fueled by booming trade for time-sensitive goods, from smartphones to fresh flowers, demand for freighters is strong while passenger 747s are phased out.
Young -400s were sold for 320 million yuan ($50 million) and Boeing stopped converting freighters, which used to cost nearly $30 million.
This comeback helped the airframer financing arm Boeing Capital to shrink its exposure to the 747-8 from $1.07 billion in 2017 to $481 million in 2018.

In July 2020, British Airways announced that it was retiring its 747 fleet. The final British Airways 747 flights departed London Heathrow on October 8, 2020.

Orders and deliveries 

Boeing 747 orders and deliveries (cumulative, by year):

Orders and deliveries through to the end of February 2023.

Model summary

Accidents and incidents 

, the 747 has been involved in 173 aviation accidents and incidents, including 64 hull loss accidents causing  fatalities. There have been several hijackings of Boeing 747s, such as Pan Am Flight 73, a 747-100 hijacked by four terrorists, causing 20 deaths.

Few crashes have been attributed to 747 design flaws. The Tenerife airport disaster resulted from pilot error and communications failure, while the Japan Airlines Flight 123 and China Airlines Flight 611 crashes stemmed from improper aircraft repair. United Airlines Flight 811, which suffered an explosive decompression mid-flight on February 24, 1989, led the National Transportation Safety Board (NTSB) to issue a recommendation that the Boeing 747-100 and 747-200 cargo doors similar to those on the Flight 811 aircraft be modified to those featured on the Boeing . Korean Air Lines Flight 007 was shot down by a Soviet fighter aircraft in 1983 after it had strayed into Soviet territory, causing US President Ronald Reagan to authorize the then-strictly-military global positioning system (GPS) for civilian use.

Accidents due to design deficiencies included TWA Flight 800, where a 747-100 exploded in mid-air on July 17, 1996, probably due to sparking electrical wires inside the fuel tank. This finding led the FAA to adopt a rule in July 2008 requiring installation of an inerting system in the center fuel tank of most large aircraft, after years of research into solutions. El Al Flight 1862 crashed after the fuse pins for an engine broke off shortly after take-off due to metal fatigue. Instead of simply dropping away from the wing, the engine knocked off the adjacent engine and damaged the wing.

Aircraft on display 

As increasing numbers of "classic" 747-100 and  series aircraft have been retired, some have been used for other uses such as museum displays. Some older 747-300s and 747-400s were later added to museum collections.
 20235/001 – 747-121 registration N7470 City of Everett, the first 747 and prototype, is at the Museum of Flight, Seattle, Washington.
 19651/025 – 747-121 registration N747GE at the Pima Air & Space Museum, Tucson, Arizona, US.
 19778/027 – 747-151 registration N601US nose at the National Air and Space Museum, Washington, D.C.
 19661/070 – 747-121(SF) registration N681UP preserved at a plaza on Jungong Road, Shanghai, China.
 19896/072 – 747-132(SF) registration N481EV at the Evergreen Aviation & Space Museum, McMinnville, Oregon, US.
 20107/086 – 747-123 registration N905NA, a NASA Shuttle Carrier Aircraft, at the Johnson Space Center, Houston, Texas.
 20269/150 – 747-136 registration G-AWNG nose at Hiller Aviation Museum, San Carlos, California.
 20239/160 – 747-244B registration ZS-SAN nicknamed Lebombo, at the South African Airways Museum Society, Rand Airport, Johannesburg, South Africa.
 20541/200 – 747-128 registration F-BPVJ at Musée de l'Air et de l'Espace, Paris, France.
 20770/213 – 747-2B5B registration HL7463 at Jeongseok Aviation Center, Jeju, South Korea.
 20713/219 - 747-212B(SF) registration N482EV at the Evergreen Aviation & Space Museum, McMinnville, Oregon, US.
 21134/288 – 747SP-44 registration ZS-SPC at the South African Airways Museum Society, Rand Airport, Johannesburg, South Africa.
 21549/336 – 747-206B registration PH-BUK at the Aviodrome, Lelystad, Netherlands.
 21588/342 – 747-230B(M) registration D-ABYM preserved at Technik Museum Speyer, Germany.
 21650/354 – 747-2R7F/SCD registration G-MKGA preserved at Cotswold Airport as an event space.
 22145/410 – 747-238B registration VH-EBQ at the Qantas Founders Outback Museum, Longreach, Queensland, Australia.
 22455/515 – 747-256BM registration EC-DLD Lope de Vega nose at the National Museum of Science and Technology, A Coruña, Spain.
 23223/606 – 747-338 registration VH-EBU at Melbourne Avalon Airport, Avalon, Victoria, Australia. VH-EBU is an ex-Qantas airframe formerly decorated in the Nalanji Dreaming livery, currently in use as a training aircraft and film set.
 23719/696 – 747-451 registration N661US at the Delta Flight Museum, Atlanta, Georgia, US. This particular plane was the first  in service, as well as the prototype.
 24354/731 – 747-438 registration VH-OJA at Shellharbour Airport, Albion Park Rail, New South Wales, Australia.
 21441/306 - SOFIA - 747SP-21 registration N747NA at Pima Air and Space Museum in Tucson, Arizona. Former Pan Am and United Airlines 747SP bought by NASA and converted into a flying telescope, for astronomy purposes. Named Clipper Lindbergh.

Other uses 

Upon its retirement from service, the 747 which was number two in the production line was dismantled and shipped to Hopyeong, Namyangju, Gyeonggi-do, South Korea where it was re-assembled, repainted in a livery similar to that of Air Force One and converted into a restaurant. Originally flown commercially by Pan Am as N747PA, Clipper Juan T. Trippe, and repaired for service following a tailstrike, it stayed with the airline until its bankruptcy. The restaurant closed by 2009, and the aircraft was scrapped in 2010.

A former British Airways 747-200B, G-BDXJ, is parked at the Dunsfold Aerodrome in Surrey, England and has been used as a movie set for productions such as the 2006 James Bond film, Casino Royale. The airplane also appears frequently in the television series Top Gear, which is filmed at Dunsfold.

The Jumbo Stay hostel, using a converted 747-200 formerly registered as 9V-SQE, opened at Arlanda Airport, Stockholm in January 2009.

A former Pakistan International Airlines 747-300 was converted into a restaurant by Pakistan's Airports Security Force in 2017. It is located at Jinnah International Airport, Karachi.

The wings of a 747 have been repurposed as roofs of a house in Malibu, California.

Specifications

Cultural impact 

Following its debut, the 747 rapidly achieved iconic status. The aircraft entered the cultural lexicon as the original Jumbo Jet, a term coined by the aviation media to describe its size, and was also nicknamed Queen of the Skies. Test pilot David P. Davies described it as "a most impressive aeroplane with a number of exceptionally fine qualities", and praised its flight control system as "truly outstanding" because of its redundancy.

Appearing in over 300 film productions, the 747 is one of the most widely depicted civilian aircraft and is considered by many as one of the most iconic in film history. It has appeared in film productions such as Airport 1975 and Airport '77 disaster films, Air Force One, Die Hard 2, and Executive Decision.

See also

References

Notes

Bibliography 

 Bowers, Peter M. Boeing Aircraft Since 1916. London: Putnam Aeronautical Books, 1989. .
 Davies, R.E.G. Delta: An Airline and Its Aircraft: The Illustrated History of a Major U.S. Airline and the People Who Made It. McLean, VA: Paladwr Press, 1990. .
 Donald, David and Lake, Jon. Encyclopedia of World Military Aircraft. London: Aerospace Publishing, 1996. .
 Haenggi, Michael. Boeing Widebodies. St. Paul, MN: MBI Publishing Co., 2003. .
 Irving, Clive. Wide Body: The Making of the Boeing 747. Philadelphia: Coronet, 1994. .
 Itabashi, M., K. Kawata and S. Kusaka. "Pre-fatigued 2219-T87 and 6061-T6 aluminium alloys." Structural Failure: Technical, Legal and Insurance Aspects. Milton Park, Abingdon, Oxon.: Taylor & Francis, 1995. .
 Jenkins, Dennis R. Boeing 747-100/200/300/SP (AirlinerTech Series, Vol. 6). North Branch, MN: Specialty Press, 2000. .
 Kane, Robert M. Air Transportation: 1903–2003. Dubuque, IA: Kendall Hunt Publishing Co., 2004. .
 Lawrence, Philip K. and David Weldon Thornton. Deep Stall: The Turbulent Story of Boeing Commercial Airplanes. Burlington, VT: Ashgate Publishing Co., 2005, .
 Norris, Guy and Mark Wagner. Boeing 747: Design and Development Since 1969. St. Paul, MN: MBI Publishing Co., 1997. .
 Norton, Bill. Lockheed Martin C-5 Galaxy. North Branch, MN: Specialty Press, 2003. .
 Orlebar, Christopher. The Concorde Story. Oxford: Osprey Publishing, 5th ed., 2002. .
 Sutter, Joe. 747: Creating the World's First Jumbo Jet and Other Adventures from a Life in Aviation. Washington, DC: Smithsonian Books, 2006. .
 Taylor, John W. R. (editor). Jane's All the World's Aircraft 1988–89. Coulsdon, UK: Jane's Defence Data, 1988. .
 Thisdell, Dan and Seymour, Chris. "World Airliner Census". Flight International, July 30 – August 5, 2019, Vol. 196, No. 5697. pp. 24–47. .

Further reading 

 Ingells, Douglas J. 747: Story of the Boeing Super Jet. Fallbrook, CA: Aero Publishers, 1970. .
 The Great Gamble: The Boeing 747. The Boeing – Pan Am Project to Develop, Produce, and Introduce the 747. Tuscaloosa: University of Alabama Press, 1973. .
 Seo, Hiroshi. Boeing 747. Worthing, West Sussex: Littlehampton Book Services Ltd., 1984. .
 Lucas, Jim. Boeing 747 – The First 20 Years. Browcom Pub. Ltd, 1988. .
 Wright, Alan J. Boeing 747. Hersham, Surrey: Ian Allan, 1989. .
 Minton, David H. The Boeing 747 (Aero Series 40). Fallbrook, CA: Aero Publishers, 1991. .
 Shaw, Robbie. Boeing 747 (Osprey Civil Aircraft series). London: Osprey, 1994. .
 Baum, Brian. Boeing 747-SP (Great Airliners, Vol. 3). Osceola, WI: Motorbooks International, 1997. .
 Falconer, Jonathan. Boeing 747 in Color. Hersham, Surrey: Ian Allan, 1997. .
 Gilchrist, Peter. Boeing 747-400 (Airliner Color History). Osceola, WI: Motorbooks International, 1998. .
 Henderson, Scott. Boeing 747-100/200 In Camera. Minneapolis, MN: Scoval Publishing, 1999. .
 Pealing, Norman, and Savage, Mike. Jumbo Jetliners: Boeing's 747 and the Widebodies (Osprey Color Classics). Osceola, WI: Motorbooks International, 1999. .
 Shaw, Robbie. Boeing 747-400: The Mega-Top (Osprey Civil Aircraft series)/ London: Osprey, 1999. .
 Wilson, Stewart. Boeing 747 (Aviation Notebook Series). Queanbeyan, NSW: Wilson Media Pty. Ltd, 1999.  .
 Wilson, Stewart. Airliners of the World. Fyshwick, Australia: Aerospace Publications Pty Ltd., 1999. .
 Birtles, Philip. Boeing 747-400. Hersham, Surrey: Ian Allan, 2000. .
 Bowman, Martin. Boeing 747 (Crowood Aviation Series). Marlborough, Wilts.: Crowood, 2000. 
 Dorr, Robert F. Boeing 747-400 (AirlinerTech Series, Vol. 10). North Branch, MN: Specialty Press, 2000. .
 Gesar, Aram. Boeing 747: The Jumbo. New York: Pyramid Media Group, 2000. .
 Gilchrist, Peter. Boeing 747 Classic (Airliner Color History). Osceola, WI: Motorbooks International, 2000. .
 Graham, Ian. In Control: How to Fly a 747. Somerville, MA: Candlewick, 2000. .
 Nicholls, Mark. The Airliner World Book of the Boeing 747. New York: Osprey Publishing, 2002. .
 March, Peter. The Boeing 747 Story. Stroud, Glos.: The History Press, 2009. .

External links 

 
 
 
 
 
 
 
 
 
 
 
 
 
 
 

 
1960s United States airliners
Quadjets
Aircraft first flown in 1969
Double-deck aircraft